The 1888–89 season was the sixth to be played by the team that are now known as Bristol Rovers, and their fifth playing under the name Eastville Rovers. It was significant as being the first season in which the club won a trophy, taking the Gloucestershire Cup title in just the second year of the tournament's existence.

Season review

Before the season began, Fred Channing was re-elected as club captain, with W.J. Somerton continuing in his role of vice captain. S. Burgess and W. Braund were re-elected as second XI captain and vice captain respectively, and W.S. Perrin was confirmed as the club's secretary and treasurer. The start of the second Gloucestershire Cup tournament was deferred until January due to some clubs being unhappy with the interference the competition had caused with the regular club match schedule the previous season.

The draw for the first round of the Cup was made on the 13 December. Eleven teams entered the competition this year, four more than in its inaugural season, and Eastville Rovers were paired with St Agnes in one of three ties in the opening round. The other fixtures were Warmley v Old Boys, Q.E.H. (who had been known as Globe F.C. until this season) and Clifton v St George. Southville, Wick & Doynton, St Simon, Kingswood, and Craigmore College were all given byes to the second round.

Rovers were victorious against St Agnes, earning them a second-round tie against tournament newcomers Wick & Doynton. This game was played in Warmley, and refereed by world-famous cricketer W. G. Grace, but following a 2–1 defeat to the Eastville club the home team appealed the result, claiming that proper procedures hadn't been followed when appointing the match official. The Gloucestershire FA upheld the complaint and the game was replayed two weeks after the original tie with a new referee taking charge. The standard of the officiating of the replayed match was the subject of some criticism, both by the local press and the crowd in attendance on the day, but the outcome was an identical result to when the game was played originally.

A goalless draw against Kingswood in the semi-final led to a replay on the Chequers Ground, which looked like ending in another stalemate until Walter Perrin grabbed a late winner for Eastville. This earned them their first appearance in the final, where they would face pre-match favourites, and one of the strongest teams in the Bristol area, Warmley. Perrin was again the hero in the final, scoring the only goal at the St George Cricket & Football Club in front of an estimated 3,000 spectators.

Results

First team

Gloucestershire Cup

Club matches

Second team

Statistics
Friendly matches are not included in this section.

Cumulative record
The total cumulative record of Eastville Rovers up to the end of the 1888–89 season is shown below. This is calculated by adding the numbers in the section above to the total games played last season. Friendly matches are not included in this table, and games held at neutral venues are considered to have been played away from home.

As of the summer of 1889, Rovers' competitive matches had all been played in the Gloucestershire Cup.

References

Bibliography

Bristol Rovers F.C. seasons
Eastville Rovers